The Essex Region Conservation Authority (ERCA) is a public-sector agency with delegated provincial authority to address risks of natural hazards, relating to flooding and erosion. 

ERCA was established in 1973 to manage the natural resources of the Essex Region in partnership with its member municipalities and the Province of Ontario. The organization's nine member municipalities include the City of Windsor, and the Township of Pelee Island.

ERCA maintains the following 19 parks and recreation areas:

 Andrew Murray O'Neill Memorial Woods (woods and trail along former Leamington-Comber rail line)
 Amherstburg-Essex Greenway
 Hillman Marsh Conservation Area
 Holiday Beach Conservation Area
 John R. Park Homestead Conservation Area
 Chrysler Canada Greenway
 Stone Road Alvar (Pelee, Ontario)
 Cedar Creek Conservation Area
 Cedar Beach Conservation Area
 Kopegaron Woods Conservation Area
 Devonwood Conservation Area
 Maidstone Conservation Area
 McAuliffe Woods Conservation Area
 Ruscom Shores Conservation Area
 Tremblay Beach Conservation Area
 Big Creek Conservation Area
 White Sands Conservation Area
 Crystal Bay Conservation Area
 River Canard Canard Valley Conservation Area
 Kingsville Train Station
 Cypher Systems Group Greenway

See also 
 Conservation authority

External links 
 Essex Region Conservation Authority

Conservation authorities in Ontario
Essex County, Ontario
Organizations based in Windsor, Ontario